William Robert Coleman (16 August 1917 – 21 July 1992) was an Anglican bishop in the 20th century.

Coleman was educated at the University of Toronto and ordained in 1943. He began his career with a curacy at the Church of the Epiphany, Sudbury. then its Priest in charge 1943–45. He was then successively Professor of Religious Philosophy and Ethics at Wycliffe College, Dean of Divinity at Bishop's University and Principal of Huron College. In 1961 he became Bishop of Kootenay, a post he held for four years.

See also

References

1917 births
1992 deaths
University of Toronto alumni
Academic staff of Bishop's University
Anglican bishops of Kootenay
20th-century Anglican Church of Canada bishops